Lockport Township is a civil township of St. Joseph County in the U.S. state of Michigan. The population was 3,814 at the 2000 census.

History
Lockport Township was established in 1840 by the division of what is now Fabius Township.

Geography

Demographics
As of the census of 2000, there were 3,814 people, 1,451 households, and 1,067 families residing in the township. The racial makeup of the township was 85.92% White, 10.38% African American, 0.42% Native American, 0.58% Asian, 0.89% from other races, and 1.81% from two or more races. Hispanic or Latino of any race were 2.23% of the population.

There were 1,451 households, out of which 36.0% had children under the age of 18 living with them, 58.0% were married couples living together, 11.3% had a female householder with no husband present, and 26.4% were non-families. 21.4% of all households were made up of individuals, and 9.2% had someone living alone who was 65 years of age or older.  The average household size was 2.63 and the average family size was 3.04.

In the township the population was spread out, with 28.7% under the age of 18, 7.8% from 18 to 24, 28.9% from 25 to 44, 23.3% from 45 to 64, and 11.3% who were 65 years of age or older.  The median age was 35 years. For every 100 females, there were 97.5 males.  For every 100 females age 18 and over, there were 93.2 males.

The median income for a household in the township was $43,931, and the median income for a family was $52,760. Males had a median income of $38,143 versus $27,196 for females. The per capita income for the township was $21,184.  About 8.5% of families and 9.9% of the population were below the poverty line, including 12.5% of those under age 18 and 7.6% of those age 65 or over.

References

Notes

Sources

Townships in St. Joseph County, Michigan
1840 establishments in Michigan
Populated places established in 1840
Townships in Michigan